Persea indica is a large, evergreen tree in the laurel family (Lauraceae), native to humid uplands on Madeira and the Canary Islands in the North Atlantic. It belongs to the genus Persea, a group of evergreen trees including the avocado. It is threatened by habitat loss.

It has been introduced to a number of islands in the nearby Azores.

Overview

Fossil evidence indicates that genus Persea originated in West Africa during the Paleocene, and spread to Asia, South America, Europe and North America. It is thought that the gradual drying of Africa, west Asia, and the Mediterranean from the Oligocene to the Pleistocene, and the glaciation of Europe during the Pleistocene, caused the extinction of the genus across these regions, resulting in the present distribution. Genus Persea disappeared from increasingly xerophytic Africa, starting with the formation of the Benguela Current. It is extinct in Africa, save for  P. indica, which survives in the cloud forests of the Canary Islands.

Fossil record
Fossils of Persea indica have been described from the fossil flora of Kızılcahamam district in Turkey, which is of early Pliocene age.

See also
 List of animal and plant symbols of the Canary Islands

References

indica
Flora of Madeira
Flora of the Canary Islands
Flora of Macaronesia
Trees of Mediterranean climate
Conservation dependent plants
Taxonomy articles created by Polbot